Tropical cyclones in 2002 were spread out across seven different areas called basins. To date, 123 tropical cyclones formed in 2002. 80 tropical cyclones had been named by either a Regional Specialized Meteorological Center (RSMC) or a Tropical Cyclone Warning Center (TCWC). Zoe was also the second-most intense system before striking Fiji. The costliest and deadliest tropical cyclone of the year was Typhoon Rusa. Rusa killed 233 in South Korea and causing $4.2 billion (2002 USD) in damages. 26 Category 3 tropical cyclones, including eight Category 5 tropical cyclones formed in 2002.

Tropical cyclone activity in each basin is under the authority of an RSMC. The National Hurricane Center (NHC) is responsible for tropical cyclones in the North Atlantic and East Pacific. The Central Pacific Hurricane Center (CPHC) is responsible for tropical cyclones in the Central Pacific. Both the NHC and CPHC are subdivisions of the National Weather Service. Activity in the West Pacific is monitored by the Japan Meteorological Agency (JMA). Systems in the North Indian Ocean are monitored by the India Meteorological Department (IMD). The Météo-France located in Réunion (MFR) monitors tropical activity in the South-West Indian Ocean. The Australian region is monitored by five TCWCs that are under the coordination of the Australian Bureau of Meteorology (BOM). Similarly, the South Pacific is monitored by both the Fiji Meteorological Service (FMS) and the Meteorological Service of New Zealand Limited. Other, unofficial agencies that provide additional guidance in tropical cyclone monitoring include the Philippine Atmospheric, Geophysical and Astronomical Services Administration (PAGASA) and the Joint Typhoon Warning Center (JTWC).

Global atmospheric and hydrological conditions

During most of 2002, El Niño existed. This negatively impacted activity in the Atlantic, but the Western Pacific was above average as a result.

Seasonal summary

North Atlantic Ocean

The season produced fourteen tropical cyclones, of which twelve developed into named storms; four became hurricanes, and two attained major hurricane status. While the season's first cyclone did not develop until July 14, activity quickly picked up: eight storms developed in the month of September. It ended early however, with no tropical storms forming after October 6—a rare occurrence caused partly by El Niño conditions. The most intense hurricane of the season was Hurricane Isidore with a minimum central pressure of 934 mbar, although Hurricane Lili attained higher winds and peaked at Category 4 whereas Isidore only reached Category 3.

The season was less destructive than normal, causing an estimated $2.47 billion (2002 USD) in property damage and 23 fatalities.
Most destruction was due to Isidore, which caused about $1.28 billion (2002 USD) in damage and killed seven people in the Yucatán Peninsula and later the United States, and Hurricane Lili, which caused $1.16 billion (2002 USD) in damage and 15 deaths as it crossed the Caribbean Sea and eventually made landfall in Louisiana.

Eastern Pacific Ocean

The season was slightly above average as it saw three tropical cyclones reach Category 5 intensity on the Saffir–Simpson scale, tied for the most in a season with 1994 and 2018. The strongest storm this year was Hurricane Kenna, which reached Category 5 on the Saffir–Simpson scale. It made landfall near Puerto Vallarta, located in the Mexican state of Jalisco, on October 25. Elsewhere, Tropical Storm Julio made landfall in Mexico, and Tropical Storm Boris dumped torrential rain along the Mexican coast, despite remaining offshore.

Other storms were individually unusual. Hurricanes Elida and Hernan also reached Category 5 intensity, but neither caused any damage. Hurricane Fausto had no effect on land, but it regenerated into a weak tropical storm at an abnormally high latitude.

Western Pacific Ocean

The season was slightly above average with many tropical cyclones affecting Japan and China. Every month had tropical activity, with most storms forming from July through October. Overall, there were 44 tropical depressions declared officially or unofficially, of which 26 became named storms; of those, there were 15 typhoons, which is the equivalent of a minimal hurricane, while 8 of the 15 typhoon intensified into super typhoons unofficially by the JTWC. The season began early with the first storm, Tapah, developing on January 10, east of the Philippines. Two months later, Typhoon Mitag became the first super typhoon  ever to be recorded in March. In June, Typhoon Chataan dropped heavy rainfall in the Federated States of Micronesia, killing 48 people and becoming the deadliest natural disaster in the state of Chuuk. Chataan later left heavy damage in Guam before striking Japan. In August, Typhoon Rusa became the deadliest typhoon in South Korea in 43 years, causing 238 deaths and $4.2 billion in damage. Typhoon Higos in October was the fifth strongest typhoon to strike Tokyo since World War II. The final typhoon of the season was Typhoon Pongsona, which was one of the costliest storms on record in Guam; it did damage worth $700 million on the island before dissipating on December 11.

The season began early, but did not become active until June, when six storms passed near or over Japan after a ridge weakened. Nine storms developed in July, many of which influenced the monsoon trough over the Philippines to produce heavy rainfall and deadly flooding. The flooding was worst in Luzon, where 85 people were killed. The series of storms caused the widespread closure of schools and offices. Many roads were damaged, and the floods left about $1.8 million (₱94.2 million PHP) in crop damage, largely to rice and corn. Overall damage from the series of storms was estimated at $10.3 million (₱522 million PHP). From June to September, heavy rainfall affected large portions of China, resulting in devastating flooding that killed over 1,500 people and left $8.2 billion (¥68 billion CNY) in damage. During this time, Tropical Storm Kammuri struck southern China with a large area of rainfall that damaged or destroyed 245,000 houses. There were 153 deaths related to the storm, mostly inland in Hunan, and damage totaled $322 million (¥2.665 billion CNY). Activity shifted farther to the east after September, with Typhoon Higos striking Japan in October and Typhoon Pongsona hitting Guam in December.

During most of the year, sea surface temperatures were above normal near the equator, and were highest around 160° E from January to July, and in November. Areas of convection developed farther east than usual, causing many storms to develop east of 150° E. The average point of formation was 145.9° E, the easternmost point since 1951. Partially as a result, no tropical storms made landfall in the Philippines for the first time since 1951, according to the JMA. Two storms – Ele and Huko – entered the basin from the Central Pacific, east of the International Date Line. Overall, there were 26 named storms in the basin in 2002, which was slightly below the norm of 26.7. A total of 15 of the 26 storms became typhoons, a slightly higher than normal proportion.

North Indian Ocean

The season was below average, with only seven tropical cyclones, four cyclonic storms, and one severe cyclonic storm. The first storm, in the Arabian Sea, formed on May 6 from a low-pressure area. It went on to strengthen into a weak cyclonic storm, being designated ARB 01, and make landfall in Oman four days later, causing intense damage. ARB 01 simultaneously dissipated. The rest of May featured two tropical depressions. The first, according to the JTWC, reached tropical storm-equivalent strength and made landfall in Myanmar. The second was recognized only by the Thailand Meteorological Department and was not given a number. There was no activity in June, July, August, or September, the first instance of such in the history of the IMD. Then, on October 22, Depression BOB 02 formed. It did not intensify and dissipated two days later. No storms formed again until BOB 03 on November 10. This storm strengthened into a severe cyclonic storm, before making landfall in West Bengal two days later and dissipating. Like all the other storms in the season, BOB 03 failed to reach hurricane strength. Two more cyclonic storms formed in the Bay of Bengal. BOB 04 was in late November and did not affect land. BOB 05 formed very far south on December 21, scraped Sri Lanka, and dissipated in the open bay.

South Pacific Ocean

2001–02

2002 began with two storms active in the basin: Severe Tropical Cyclone Waka and Tropical Depression 05F. Waka, at the time, was a Category 4 severe tropical cyclone near Niue. Waka dissipated on January 2, and nothing formed but tropical depressions until Severe Tropical Cyclone Claudia entered the basin on February 12. Claudia rapidly weakened and dissipated two days later. The next non-tropical depression also crossed over, Des, on March 5. Due to unfavorable conditions, Des also dissipated. Following Des's dissipation, four official and one unofficial tropical depression formed. The season ended on April 22.

The 2001–02 season was one of the least active on record.

2002–03

The season began very early, starting with Tropical Depression 17F on July 3. After that, however, the season was quiet, with one tropical depression forming in mid October. By November, a tropical cyclone, Yolande had formed, as well as another tropical depression. In December, activity sped up, with Cyclone Zoe, a Category 5 severe tropical cyclone, forming. There were more tropical cyclones, but they were in 2003.

With seven severe tropical cyclones in total, the 2002–03 season was one of the most active ever recorded.

Australian region

2001–02

On 1 January 2002, Tropical Cyclone Bernie had just formed near Northern Territory. Bernie made landfall in Northern Territory four days later, causing minor damages, and then dissipated. Then, on 2 February, Tropical Cyclone Chris formed. It rapidly intensified into a Category 5 severe tropical cyclone. On 6 February, Chris made landfall in Western Australia, and dissipated later in the day. Chris caused 12 deaths and some damage. Five days later, Tropical Cyclone Claudia formed, and dissipated without affecting land. After another tropical low, Tropical Cyclone Des formed on 4 March near Papua New Guinea. Three days later, Des crossed over to the South Pacific.

After Des, the season was quiet until a tropical cyclone was named Dianne on 7 April. Dianne passed close to the Cocos Islands, intensified into a Category 3 tropical cyclone, and moved westward into the South-West Indian Ocean on 11 April. Simultaneously with Dianne, Tropical Cyclone Bonnie was forming. On 11 April, Bonnie moved over Timor and Java and caused some damage, killing 19 people. In early May, Tropical Low Errol formed. On 26 May, Tropical Cyclone Upia, the season's last storm, formed near Papua New Guinea and was named by TCWC Port Moresby. It crossed Budibudi Island and caused severe damage there. Once Upia dissipated on 28 May, the season was over.

The 2001–02 season was a near-normal tropical cyclone season.

2002–03

In 2002, this season was very inactive. According to the Joint Typhoon Warning Center, the first tropical cyclone of the year, Tropical Depression 07S formed on 27 December. It did not strengthen, and dissipated on 3 January 2003. It was not recognised by the BoM.

The season was more active in 2003; for more information see Tropical cyclones in 2003.

Southwest Indian Ocean

2001–02

The 2001–02 South-West Indian Ocean cyclone season was very active from its start. The 2002 half of the season began with Tropical Storm Cyprien, which made landfall in western Madagascar and dissipated on 3 January. Next was Intense Tropical Cyclone Dina, which caused record flooding in Mauritius and Reunion. Approximately fifteen people died in the storm. Towards the end of January, Tropical Cyclone Eddy formed, but dissipated on 30 January without affecting land. On the day that Eddy dissipated, a tropical low crossed into the basin and eventually became Intense Tropical Cyclone Francesca. Francesca moved southward, and in the open ocean, dissipated on 11 February. On 5 February, a tropical disturbance, classified as 09, formed in the Mozambique Channel, and dissipated the very next day.

In mid-February, a tropical depression formed over Madagascar. Moving east, it strengthened into Intense Tropical Cyclone Guillaume. On 18 February, Guillaume moved to the south and affected Mauritius. In the following days, Guillaume deteriorated due to wind shear, and dissipated on 23 February.

2002–03

Systems

January

January was a very active month, with nine tropical cyclones (3 forming in December 2001), of which six were named. 2002 began with three tropical cyclones active: Tropical Cyclone Bernie in Australia, Tropical Storm Cyprien in Madagascar, and Tropical Depression 05F in the Solomon Islands. After these storms dissipated, Tropical Storm Tapah formed on 9 January, becoming the first Northern Hemisphere tropical cyclone in 2002.

February

February was active, with eleven tropical cyclones, though it was extremely inactive in named storms, with only four: Chris, Claudia, Guillaume, and Mitag.

March
A total of 6 systems formed during March, of which 3 became named storms. The strongest storm of March was Cyclone Hary.

April

There were five tropical cyclones, of which two were named.

May

June

July

August

September

October

November

December

Global effects

1 Only systems that formed either on or after January 1, 2002 are counted in the seasonal totals.
2 Only systems that formed either before or on December 31, 2002 are counted in the seasonal totals.3 The wind speeds for this tropical cyclone/basin are based on the IMD Scale which uses 3-minute sustained winds.
4 The wind speeds for this tropical cyclone/basin are based on the Saffir Simpson Scale which uses 1-minute sustained winds.5 The wind speeds for this tropical cyclone/basins are based on JMA Scale, Australian tropical cyclone intensity scale or Météo-France which uses 10-minute sustained winds.

See also

 List of earthquakes in 2002
 Tornadoes of 2002

Notes

References

External links 

Regional Specialized Meteorological Centers
 US National Hurricane Center – North Atlantic, Eastern Pacific
 Central Pacific Hurricane Center – Central Pacific
 Japan Meteorological Agency – NW Pacific
 India Meteorological Department – Bay of Bengal and the Arabian Sea
 Météo-France – La Reunion – South Indian Ocean from 30°E to 90°E
 Fiji Meteorological Service – South Pacific west of 160°E, north of 25° S

Tropical Cyclone Warning Centers
 Meteorology, Climatology, and Geophysical Agency of Indonesia – South Indian Ocean from 90°E to 141°E, generally north of 10°S
 Australian Bureau of Meteorology (TCWC's Perth, Darwin & Brisbane) – South Indian Ocean & South Pacific Ocean from 90°E to 160°E, generally south of 10°S
  – Australian Region only
 Papua New Guinea National Weather Service – South Pacific Ocean from 141°E to 160°E, generally north of 10°S
 Meteorological Service of New Zealand Limited – South Pacific west of 160°E, south of 25°S

2002 Atlantic hurricane season
2002 Pacific typhoon season
2001–02 Australian region cyclone season
2001–02 South Pacific cyclone season
2002–03 South Pacific cyclone season
2002–03 South-West Indian Ocean cyclone season
Tropical cyclones by year
2002 Pacific hurricane season
2002 North Indian Ocean cyclone season
2002–03 Australian region cyclone season
2001–02 South-West Indian Ocean cyclone season
2002-related lists